N-Terminal domain antiandrogens are a novel type of antiandrogen that bind to the N-terminal domain of the androgen receptor (AR) instead of the ligand-binding domain (where all currently-available antiandrogens bind) and disrupt interactions between the AR and its coregulatory binding partners, thereby blocking AR-mediated gene transcription. They are being investigated for the treatment of prostate cancer.

See also
 Androgen deprivation therapy
 5N-Bicalutamide

References

Antiandrogens